The FIBT World Championships 2015 took place at the Winterberg bobsleigh, luge, and skeleton track in Winterberg, Germany, for the fourth time from 23 February to 8 March 2015.

Winterberg was selected on 16 July 2011 during congress of the FIBT in Pyeongchang.

Schedule
Six events were held over a period of 2 weeks.

Medal summary

Medal table

Bobsleigh

Skeleton

Mixed

References

External links
Official website

 
IBSF World Championships
International sports competitions hosted by Germany
2015 in bobsleigh
2015 in skeleton
2015 in German sport
Bobsleigh in Germany
Skeleton in Germany